The Maxus G50 is a compact MPV or minivan launched on the Chinese car market in February 2019.

Overview

Price range of the Maxus G50 ranges from CN¥86,800 to 156,800. The G50 is the second MPV under the Maxus brand following the larger Maxus G10, which is a sub-brand owned by the Shanghai Automotive Industry Corporation (SAIC).

In the Chinese market the Maxus G50 was launched with two powertrain options including a 1.3-liter inline-4 turbo engine producing 163 hp (120 kW) and 230 Nm and a 1.5-liter inline-4 turbo engine producing 169 hp (124 kW) and 250 Nm. 

Transmission options include a 6-speed manual transmission and a 7-speed dual-clutch transmission.

Maxus EUNIQ 5

The Maxus EUNIQ 5 (formerly called EG50) is the electric version of the gasoline-powered Maxus G50. The EUNIQ 5 was launched during the Shanghai Auto Show in April 2019. Styling-wise, the EUNIQ 5 is mostly the same as the G50 while adding blue accents in the grilles and intakes to differentiate it from the gasoline variant.

The EUNIQ 5 is powered by an electric motor producing 116 hp.

It is exported to some European countries such as Spain and Finland.

References

External links

https://www.saicmaxus.com/g50.shtml

G50
Minivans
Production electric cars
Cars introduced in 2019
Front-wheel-drive vehicles